The 1951 Mississippi State Maroons football team represented Mississippi State College—now known as Mississippi State University—as a member of the Southeastern Conference (SEC) during the 1951 college football season. Led by Arthur Morton in his third and final season as head coach, the Maroons compiled an overall record of 4–5 with a mark of 2–5 in conference play, placing 11th in the SEC. Morton was fired after his third consecutive losing season.

Schedule

References

Mississippi State
Mississippi State Bulldogs football seasons
Mississippi State Maroons football